Lejeunea hodgsoniana is a species of liverwort named in honour of Eliza Amy Hodgson. The often extensive mats formed by L. lamacerina are composed of small (shoots 
up to 2 cm long and 0.5–1.5 mm wide), delicate, pale green shoots. The lobules are 
smaller than the broadly rounded main leaf lobes. The underleaves are rather small 
and distant. Often fertile, with small, 5-keeled perianths.
L. cavifolia (p. 221) has relatively larger, more overlapping underleaves and 
relatively smaller lobules. L. patens (p. 223) has a large, inflated lobule, which 
makes an acute angle with the leaf lobe. L. holtii (L. eckloniana) (Paton, p. 497) is 
a rare plant of south-west Ireland, and has distinctly elliptical leaves, with rather 
small underleaves and even smaller lobules. L. mandonii (Paton, p. 500) is also very 
rare in oceanic districts; it is as tiny as Harpalejeunea molleri (p. 219), but has slightly 
elongated, rounded leaf lobes and a very distinctive, smoothly rounded perianth that 
differs from the 5-angled perianths of most related species. Aphanolejeunea (p. 227), 
Microlejeunea (p. 220), Drepanolejeunea (p. 218), etc. – are usually much smaller, 
with differently shaped leaves, often longer and thinner or pointed. 
Especially characteristic of rock faces by streams in humid valleys, and often covering 
extensive areas. It is far less frequent on crags or on trees in the uplands.

Distribution
The species is endemic to New Zealand.

References

Endemic flora of New Zealand
Lejeuneaceae
Plants described in 2013
Terrestrial biota of New Zealand